Representative sequences are short regions within protein sequences that can be used to approximate the evolutionary relationships of those proteins, or the organisms from which they come. Representative sequences are contiguous subsequences (typically 300 residues) from ubiquitous, conserved proteins, such that each orthologous family of representative sequences taken alone gives a distance matrix in close agreement with the consensus matrix.

Use 
Protein sequences can provide data about the biological function and evolution of proteins and protein domains. Grouping and interrelating protein sequences can therefore provide information about both human biological processes, and the evolutionary development of biological processes on earth; such sequence clusters allow for the effective coverage of sequence space. Sequence clusters can reduce a large database of sequences to a smaller set of sequence representatives, each of which should represent its cluster at the sequence level. Sequence representatives allow the effective coverage of the original database with fewer sequences. The database of sequence representatives is called non-redundant, as similar (or redundant) sequences have been removed at a certain similarity threshold.

References

Protein structure
Bioinformatics